The Ukraine Conflict Observatory is an American non-governmental organization which analyzes and publicizes evidence of Russian war crimes and other atrocities in the 2022 Russian invasion of Ukraine. The organization uses open source intelligence research methods and commercial satellite imagery and data to produce reports that meet legal standards for use in international accountability efforts, and real time data to aid humanitarian organizations.

Organization 
The Conflict Observatory was announced by United States Department of State press secretary Ned Price, May 17, 2022. The Conflict Observatory is a collaborative endeavor with geographic information system (GIS) company Esri, the Yale School of Public Health’s Humanitarian Research Lab (HRL), led by Nathaniel Raymond and Kaveh Khoshnood, the Smithsonian Cultural Rescue Initiative, Alcis, PlanetScape Ai, Quiet Professionals LLC, and unclassified medium-to-high resolution electro optical imagery and remote sensing data from the National Geospatial-Intelligence Agency (NGA) and National Reconnaissance Office via the Global-Enhanced GEOINT Delivery system. None of the data the Observatory uses and disseminates is classified; the satellite imagery comes from NGA's commercial contracts with private companies.

An initial $6 million investment was provided by the US State Department Bureau of Conflict and Stabilization Operations, with future funding allocated from the European Democratic Resilience Initiative (EDRI).

Reports 
On May 17, Yale's Humanitarian Research Lab provided evidence supporting allegations of violations of international law perpetrated by the armed forces of the Russian Federation in five Ukrainian cities and regions to the Organization for Security and Co-operation in Europe (OSCE) Moscow Mechanism to support an investigation by the organization. The evidence corroborated public reporting with commercial satellite imagery and open source intelligence. 

Later presented as the first Conflict Observatory report, the HRL review of 277 healthcare facilities across five cities and regions in Ukraine concluded that "Russia-aligned forces have engaged in widespread and systematic bombardment of Ukrainian healthcare facilities" and that "22 of the 277 healthcare facilities in Ukraine have sustained damage from apparent Russian bombardment between 24 February and 29 March 2022."

While executive briefs of reports will be made available to the public, the full data sets are Closed Source, though outside organizations and international investigators would be able access the full contents of the database.

References 

Non-governmental organizations
United States Department of State agencies
Organizations established in 2022